The 1994–95 Scottish Inter-District Championship rugby union Scottish Inter-District Championship saw the 'non-native' district Anglo-Scots rename their side Scottish Exiles.

1994-95 League Table

Results

Round 1

Round 2

Round 3

Round 4

Round 5

Scottish Exiles: 

North and Midlands: S Burns (Edinburgh Academicals); M Cousin (Dundee HSFP), P Rouse (Dundee HSFP), Rowen Shepherd (Edinburgh Academicals), F Swanson (Edinburgh Academicals); J Newton (Dundee HSFP), K Harper (Stirling County); John Manson (Dundee HSFP), M Scott (Dunfermline), Danny Herrington (Dundee HSFP), D McIvor (Edinburgh Academicals, captain), S Hamilton (Stirling County), Stewart Campbell (Dundee HSFP), Rob Wainwright (West Hartlepool), Gareth Flockhart (Stirling County).

Round 6

1994–95 in Scottish rugby union
1994–95
Scot